Events from the year 1819 in Sweden

Incumbents
 Monarch – Charles XIV John

Events

 7 October - Södertälje Canal
 - The charitable society Välgörande fruntimmerssällskapet is founded. It is the first organization in Sweden founded and managed by women.  
 - Öland County created.
 - Independent Order of Odd Fellows Sweden
 - Swedish Museum of Natural History

Births
 19 January - Stor-Stina, Sami (died 1854) 
 21 February – Emilia Uggla, pianist  (died 1855) 
 14 March - Erik Edlund, physicist  (died 1888) 
 25 March - Theodore Hamberg,  missionary and author  (died 1854) 
 4 July – Marie Sophie Schwartz, writer  (died 1894) 
 12 July – Wilhelmina Fundin, operatic soprano (died 1911) 
 Ebba d'Aubert, pianist  (died 1860) 
 Sophia Isberg, wood cut artist  (died 1875)

Deaths

 8 February – Cecilia Cleve, librarian
 15 February – Jacob Axelsson Lindblom, arch bishop  (born 1746) 
 19 January  – Elsa Beata Bunge, botanist  (born 1734)
 Helena Quiding, culture personality and builder  (born 1755)

References

 
Years of the 19th century in Sweden
Sweden